Mosaic Whispers (also known as "The Whispers") is a Washington University all-gender a cappella group that performs music from a variety of genres. The group has performed on MSNBC's Hardball with Chris Matthews as well as on local radio stations such as 93.7 The Bull. The group competed in the international finals of the 2016 ICCA competition. They have progressed to the regional level of four ICCA competitions and the final-four of a national competition to sing with Andy Grammer. They have toured nationally, opened for Ben Folds and Straight No Chaser, received a number of CARA nominations, and have been included on a number of national a cappella compilation albums.

History
The Mosaic Whispers was founded in 1991 by a group of students and first performed together at Washington University's Thurtene Carnival. The original roster included P. Daniel Newman, Jason Coryell, Brian Stephenson, Liz Radford, Josh Einsohn, Devorah Rosner, and Lora Norback, with the group holding auditions in fall of 1991.

The group has appeared on several compilation a cappella albums, including an appearance on the 2008 Ben Folds Presents: University A Cappella!. The Whispers were selected after submitting a video of the group performing Folds' song "Still Fighting It" to Ben Folds' university a cappella competition.

The group just released their 10th studio album, Wavelength, in the spring of 2015, and their first EP, ICCA 2016: The Extended Cuts, in the spring of 2017.

One notable alumna is Eliotte Henderson ('10) who has toured internationally as a member of Taylor Swift's band.

Ben Folds Presents: University A Cappella!
The Mosaic Whispers were selected to be featured on the album after submitting a video of the group performing Folds' song "Still Fighting It" to Ben Folds' university a cappella competition. Reviews for their rendition of "Still Fighting It" were positive, with the Norwich Bulletin praising their performance.

Andy Grammer Competition
In Spring 2012, The Whispers reached the final-four in a competition to sing with Andy Grammer. The competition, which was 12 days long, consisted of submitting three performance videos, including two Andy Grammer songs. The Whispers arranged and learned the song Fine By Me in 8 hours for their final video submission. While they won the popular vote (consisting of Facebook Likes, Tweets, and user account votes) in their final round, they ultimately lost to the professional a cappella group Six Appeal, who garnered the votes of both TopBlip and Grammer. To gain votes, the Whispers got support of both the newspaper Studlife, and the St. Louis Metro social media staff.

International Championship of Collegiate A Cappella
The group has competed several times in the Varsity Vocals International Championship of Collegiate A Cappella (ICCA). In the spring of 2016, they were the Midwest Champions and advanced to the Finals round at the Beacon Theatre in New York City, NY. There, they performed their award-winning set which included their arrangements of "Smooth" by Santana, "Elastic Heart" by Sia, "Tremors" by SOHN, and "Uptown Funk" by Bruno Mars. They also advanced to the Semifinals round of the competition in the spring of 2017.

Notable performances

In Spring 2012, the Whispers sang "Change the World" for Bill Nye and Washington University's Board of Trustees, as a part of the dedication to WUSTL's new Earth, Planetary, and Space Science Center.

Recently, the Whispers sang for the launch of Washington University's Leading Together Campaign, a multibillion-dollar fundraiser to aid the expanding university.  They also sang to help the Boatload of Toys fundraiser, a charity event for St. Louis children hosted by 93.7 St. Louis, with Mason and Remy.  They have also sung for the WUSTL Founder's Day ball on multiple occasions, which has included Robert Gates, John Huntsman, and Anderson Cooper in attendance.

Albums
Watercolors (1994)
 I Can't Make You Love Me (track 3) has been reviewed as "a sharply performed, smartly arranged, and emotionally stirring number that made substantial improvements on the original recording."
Three A.M. And Nowhere To Go (1996)
 Spin the Bottle (track 11) has been praised as having "Great solos. Great blend. Crystal clear arrangements. Bright and spirited performances."
Don't Tell My Parents (1998)
Throw Your Pennies At Someone Else (2000)
Vested Interest (2000)
Against the Grain (2000)
Defrosted (2004)
Behind Bars (2007)
 Fix You (the final track) has been reviewed as "a perfect end to a very good album."
Page 9 (2011)
 Die Alone'''s (track 7) soloist Ilana Schwartz has been praised as "a specialty", with a uniquely good voice for an Ingrid Michaelson coverWavelength (2015)ICCA 2016: The Extended Cuts - EP (2017)Oasis'' (2018)

References

Washington University in St. Louis
Collegiate a cappella groups
Musical groups from St. Louis
Musical groups established in 1991
1991 establishments in Missouri